Qurban Ali  may refer to:

Qurban Ali Khan, former governor of the Khyber-Pakhtunkhwa of Pakistan
Qurban Ali Oruzgani, current governor of Daykundi Province of Afghanistan